Snookum Russell (April 6, 1913 – August 1981) was an American pianist and leader of a territory band that played tobacco warehouses and dance halls in the South and Midwest in the 1930s, 1940s and 1950s.

Russell was born in Columbia, South Carolina, United States. Members of his bands included J. J. Johnson, who joined shortly after, and played with Fats Navarro, Ray Brown, Tommy Turrentine and Herbie Phillips.

Discography
1962: Jazz at Preservation Hall 4: The George Lewis Band of New Orleans - The George Lewis Band of New Orleans, with George Lewis (cl) Isaac "Snookum" Russell (p) Papa John Joseph (b) Joe Watkins (d) (Atlantic LP 1411)

References

American jazz pianists
American male pianists
American jazz bandleaders
1913 births
1981 deaths
20th-century American pianists
20th-century American male musicians
American male jazz musicians